Eric Thomas Chester is an American author, socialist political activist, and former economics professor.

Early life 

Born in New York City, he is the son of Harry (an economist on the research staff of the United Auto Workers) and Alice (a psychiatrist né Fried) Chester. His parents were socialist activists from Vienna. They were forced to flee Austria after the Nazis invaded in February 1938, both because of their political activities and because they were Jewish.
 
Since the UAW is based in Detroit, Michigan, Chester spent much of his youth in the Detroit area.

Student activist 

Chester attended the University of Michigan from 1964 to 1973, receiving a BA and a PhD in economics. He joined the Students for a Democratic Society (SDS) soon after coming to Ann Arbor.

In the spring of 1965 he was among those answering the call of the Student Nonviolent Coordinating Committee (SNCC), going to Montgomery, Alabama, to demonstrate against Alabama's segregationist policies and the federal government’s unwillingness to end these policies. Later that summer he once again answered the call, going to Jackson, Mississippi, in support of people struggling against the segregationist policies of Mississippi. He spent 10 days in the Hinds County jail, in Mississippi.

In October 1965 he was arrested in Ann Arbor, Michigan in the first draft board sit-in as part of one of the first acts of civil disobedience against the American government's warfare against the people of Viet Nam. He served 15 days in the Washtenaw County Jail.
He was one of several students who were reclassified for immediate induction into the army because of their participation in the sit-in. A landmark decision by the U. S. 2nd Circuit Court ruled that the draft could not be used to punish protestors.

Chester helped to form the Radical Independent Party in Ann Arbor in 1970. RIP elected two members to the Ann Arbor City Council in April 1972.  It later merged into the Michigan Human Rights Party (United States).

Career and later activism 

Chester moved to Boston, Mass in 1973. He taught economics at the University of Massachusetts-Boston from 1973-1978, where he helped to organize the faculty-staff union, an affiliate of the National Education Association.  He was also active in the New American Movement during this period.

In 1978, Chester moved to Berkeley California. He taught as an adjunct for a semester at San Francisco State University. He worked as a cab driver in San Francisco, where he became involved in protests by drivers opposed to a substantial increase in the number of cabs on the street.  The protests won a significant roll-back.

Chester joined the Socialist Party USA in 1980.  He was the Socialist Party USA's candidate for Vice President in 1996.  He campaigned for the Socialist Party USA's presidential nomination for the 2000, 2004 and 2008 elections, but lost to David McReynolds, Walt Brown and Brian Moore respectively.

Chester returned to Boston in 1986. He was an active member of the Boston area Industrial Workers of the World.

He moved to Montague, Mass in 1999 where he was active in the Socialist Party of Massachusetts (Western Mass Local). He twice ran for Congress from Massachusetts's First Congressional District, in 2002 and 2006.

Chester moved to Washington’s Olympic Peninsula in the fall of 2007. He was active in protests against the Border Patrol’s decision to set up roadblocks along the only highway in the area.

Scotland and beyond 

Chester moved to Glasgow, Scotland, UK, in the fall of 2009 and stayed until the summer of 2021. He was actively involved in the Scottish Peace Network. He took part in protests against an arms fair being held in a venue controlled by Glasgow City Council.  Following the protests, the City Council decided that it would carefully consider whether to permit future arms fairs in their venues.

Chester was also active in the Clydeside IWW General Membership Branch and the Spirit of Revolt, an archive for documents produced by Glasgow anarchist and libertarian socialist activists.

He moved to Chapel Hill, North Carolina, in August 2021. He rejoined the Socialist Party USA and is active in the local group.

Political perspective  

Following the principles and ideas of Eugene V. Debs and Rosa Luxemburg, Chester describes himself as a revolutionary democratic socialist. He remains impressed by the example set by the Wobblies in their heyday. He advocates uniting the radical and revolutionary movements into an organization that can challenge and transform the global capitalist system.

Publications and research 

In his research, Chester seeks "to probe beneath the surface", while keeping in mind that "the goals and actions of decision makers, as well as their envoys, are frequently in marked contrast to their public statements." His work relies heavily on primary archival sources.

He has published seven books. Two of the first four, Covert Network and The U. S. Intervention in the Dominican Republic, looked at "the connections between U.S. foreign policy and social democrats.” during the Cold War.

The remaining two books of the first four, Socialists and the Ballot Box and True Mission, looked into U. S. socialist history. A specific focus was the need for a socialist politics entirely independent of the two mainstream parties.

The last three books arose out of a single research project, examining the suppression of dissent during the First World War. The books are The Wobblies in Their Heyday, Yours for Industrial Freedom, an IWW anthology, and Free Speech. A final forthcoming book in this series will focus on the repression of progressives during this same period.

Books 

 Free Speech and the Suppression of Dissent During World War I, Monthly Review Press, 2020.
 Yours for Industrial Freedom, Levellers Press, 2018.
 The wobblies in their heyday : the rise and destruction of the industrial workers of the world during the World War I era,  paperback ed., Levellers Press, 2016.
 True Mission: Socialists and the Labor Party Question in the U.S., Pluto Press, 2004.
 Rag-Tags, Scum, Riff-Raff and Commies: The U.S. Intervention in the Dominican Republic, 1965–1966, New York University Press, 2001.
 Covert Network: Progressives, the International Rescue Committee, and the CIA, M. E. Sharpe, 1995.
 Socialists and the Ballot Box, Praeger Publishers, 1985.

Articles

 The Lure of the Labor Party, May 1, 2022, The Socialist,  https://www.socialistmag.org/
 Traitors, Spies and Military Tribunals: The Assault on Civil Liberties During World War I, Winter 2013 New Politics Vol. XIV No. 2, Whole Number 54)
 The Danish General Strike, Anarcho-Syndicalist Review, #25, Summer, 1999.
 Revolutionary socialism and the dictatorship of the proletariat, Critique, v17, n 1, 83-89, 1989.
 The Chilean Left, Resist Newsletter #189, Somerville, MA, Oct. 1986. 
 The popular front and the UAW,  Against the Current,  vol 2, no 2 Spring 1985, p 48-54.
 Revolutionary Socialists and Independent Political Action, Against the Current, Winter 1982.
 Electoral systems and political parties, Insurgent Sociologist, Volume: 10, issue: 1,   page(s): 27-31, July 1, 1980.
 Military spending and capitalist stability, Cambridge Journal of Economics, Volume 2, Issue 3, September 1978, Pages 293–298.
 History of the Ann Arbor Sit In, New Left Notes, Vol 1, no 2, January 28, 1966, p. 3. https://www.sds-1960s.org/NewLeftNotes-vol1-no02.pdf

Interviews 

“What’s up, Comrades?” Red Library talks to Eric Chester about “Free Speech & the Suppression of Dissent During WWI”  (1:48:11), Monthly Review,Oct 18, 2020. https://monthlyreview.org/press/whats-up-comrades-red-library-talks-to-eric-chester-about-free-speech-the-suppression-of-dissent-during-wwi/

External links 
New Politics https://newpol.org/authors/chester-eric/

See also
 2006 Massachusetts general election
 2006 United States House of Representatives elections in Massachusetts
 1996 United States presidential election

References

American anti-war activists
Economists from New York (state)
21st-century American historians
21st-century American male writers
American political writers
American male non-fiction writers
American democratic socialists
Industrial Workers of the World members
Writers from New York City
Socialist Party USA vice presidential nominees
Candidates in the 2008 United States presidential election
21st-century American politicians
1996 United States vice-presidential candidates
20th-century American politicians
1943 births
Living people
University of Michigan alumni
Activists from New York City
People from Montague, Massachusetts
Historians from Massachusetts
Historians from New York (state)
Economists from Massachusetts
21st-century American economists